Harold James (August 7, 1942 – April 28, 2022) was a Democratic politician, and member of the Pennsylvania House of Representatives. Before his election to the House of Representatives, James served as a police officer.

James represented the 186th District from 1989 until 2008, serving as the first Chairman of the Gaming Oversight Committee, which was formed at the start of the 2007 legislation session. He was then defeated in the primary election by Kenyatta Johnson.

Later, after winning a special election to replace Johnson (who was elected to Philadelphia City Council) he served from April 2012 through January 2013. He chose not to run for reelection to a full term in 2012.

In 2015 he was found guilty of corruption.

James died in Philadelphia on April 28, 2022, at the age of 79.

References

External links
Harold James (D) official PA House website
State Representative Harold James official caucus website

Follow the Money - Harold James
2008 2006 2004 2002 2000 1998 campaign contributions

1942 births
2022 deaths
Philadelphia City Council members
Democratic Party members of the Pennsylvania House of Representatives
Philadelphia Police Department officers
African-American police officers
African-American state legislators in Pennsylvania
Pennsylvania politicians convicted of crimes
Politicians from Philadelphia
Temple University alumni
21st-century African-American people
20th-century African-American people